Acantholycosa khakassica is a species of wolf spider only known from south-western Khakassia, Russia.

This brown spider, up to 9.2 mm in length, can only be separated from its closest congener, Acantholycosa petrophila by details of the genitalia.

References

Lycosidae
Spiders described in 2003
Spiders of Russia